Banksia gardneri var. hiemalis is a variety of Banksia gardneri. It is native to the Southwest Botanical Province of Western Australia. Seeds do not require any treatment, and take around 19 days to germinate.

References

 
 
 

gardneri var. hiemalis
Eudicots of Western Australia